George (Giorgi) Khelashvili (born 29 April 1975) is a Georgian politician, and serves as member of Parliament of Georgia from the Georgian Dream faction, in a position of the deputy chair of the Foreign Relations Committee

Biography

 Director of Research Center, Parliament of Georgia (2019–2020)
 Adviser to the Speaker of Parliament of Georgia (2017–2019) 
 Deputy chief of mission, Embassy of Georgia, Washington D.C. (2013–2017)
 Deputy director of the Political Department, Ministry of Foreign Affairs of Georgia (2013)
 Assistant Professor of International Relations, and project director at the Center for Social Sciences, Tbilisi State University (2010–2013)
 Assistant Professor of International Relations, Tbilisi State University (2001–2007) and Director of Academic Programs, Center for Social Sciences, Tbilisi (2004–2007)
 Chief Specialist of the Center for Foreign Policy Research and Analysis of the Ministry of Foreign Affairs of Georgia (1997–1999)

Education

 DPhil in International Relations, St Anne's College, University of Oxford (2007–2010)
 MPhil in International Relations, St Anne's College, University of Oxford (1999–2001)
 Undergraduate degree in International Relations, Tbilisi State University (1993–1998)

Other

 Visiting Fellow at the Institute for European, Russian and Eurasian Studies of the George Washington University, Washington D.C. (2010)
 Assistant Dean at St. Anne's College, University of Oxford (2010)
 Research Fellow at the Kennan Institute of the Wilson Center, Washington D.C. (2008)
 Research Assistant, Department of Politics and International Studies, University of Oxford (2007–2009)
 Oxford Colleges Hospitality Scheme research fellow, University of Oxford (2004)
 International Research and Exchanges Board (IREX) Media Grants Manager, Tbilisi (2003–2004)
 News Anchor at Rustavi-2 TV, Tbilisi (2002–2003)
 International affairs journalist at daily newspaper "24 Hours", Georgia (2002)
 Visiting Fellow at the Center for Non-Proliferation Studies, Monterey (1997–1998)
 International news anchor, Georgian State Television Morning Program "Alioni", Tbilisi (1997–1999)

References

External links
 Parliament of Georgia

1975 births
Living people
Georgian Dream politicians
Members of the Parliament of Georgia
21st-century politicians from Georgia (country)